Wayne Morris (born Bert DeWayne Morris Jr. February 17, 1914 – September 14, 1959) was an American film and television actor, as well as a decorated World War II fighter ace. He appeared in many films, including Paths of Glory (1957), The Bushwackers (1952), and the title role of Kid Galahad (1937).

Early life and career
Morris was born in Los Angeles County, California to Bert DeWayne Morris and Anna Lorea Morris ( Fitzgerald). He attended Los Angeles City College and was a fullback on that school's varsity football team. He gained acting experience through his work at the Pasadena Playhouse.

His film debut came in China Clipper (1936). He played the title character of Kid Galahad (1937), a story of a young prizefighter that featured some of Hollywood's biggest stars, Bette Davis, Edward G. Robinson and Humphrey Bogart. His career flourished in films like Brother Rat, which starred Ronald Reagan, and in Bogart's only horror film, The Return of Doctor X (1939).

Military service

While filming Flight Angels (1940), Morris became interested in flying and became a pilot. With war in the wind, he joined the Naval Reserve and became a Navy flier in 1942, leaving his film career behind for the duration of the war. 

Morris was considered by the Navy as physically 'too big' to fly fighters. After being turned down several times as a fighter pilot, he went to his uncle-in-law, Cdr. David McCampbell, imploring him for the chance to fly fighters. Cdr. McCampbell said "Give me a letter." He flew the F6F Hellcat off the aircraft carrier USS Essex with the VF-15 (Fighter Squadron 15), the famed "McCampbell Heroes."

A December 15, 1944 Associated Press news story reported that Morris was "credited with 57 aerial sorties, shooting down seven Japanese Zeros, sinking an escort vessel and a flak gunboat and helping sink a submarine and damage a heavy cruiser and a mine layer." He was awarded four Distinguished Flying Crosses and two Air Medals.

Later career

After the war, Morris returned to films, but his nearly four-year absence had cost him his burgeoning stardom. He continued to act in movies, but the pictures, for the most part, sank in quality. Losing his boyish looks but not demeanor, Morris spent much of the 1950s in low-budget westerns, but also appeared as the cowardly Lieutenant Roget, one of the main characters, in Stanley Kubrick's Paths of Glory (1957).

In 1957, Morris made his Broadway debut as a washed-up boxing champ in William Saroyan's The Cave Dwellers. 

On television, Morris starred in a 1956 episode of Science Fiction Theater, "Beam of Fire". In 1958, Morris appeared in Gunsmoke as "Nat", a groom almost shot to death. Wayne Morris played "Captain Hathaway" in 1959 on The Adventures of Ozzie and Harriet (in the episode "The Sea Captain").

Personal life
Morris was first married to tobacco heiress Leonora (Bubbles) Schinasi; the couple later divorced. Eighteen months later, Morris married the 19-year-old Patricia Ann O'Rourke at the Long Beach, California Naval Air Base February 25, 1942. He had two daughters and a son.

Death

Awards and decorations
During his naval service, Morris earned the following decorations:

Filmography

 China Clipper (1936) – Navigator on Clipper
 Here Comes Carter (1936) – Bill
 Polo Joe (1936) – Spectator (uncredited)
 King of Hockey (1936) – Bill 'Jumbo' Mullins
 Smart Blonde (1937) – Railroad Information Clerk (uncredited)
 Once a Doctor (1937) – Sailor on 'Nirvana' (uncredited)
 Land Beyond the Law (1937) – Dave Massey (Credits) / Dave Seymour
 Kid Galahad (1937) – Ward Guisenberry / Kid Galahad
 Submarine D-1 (1937) – 'Sock' McGillis
 The Kid Comes Back (1938) – Rush Conway
 Love, Honor and Behave (1938) – Ted Painter
 Men Are Such Fools (1938) – Jimmy Hall
 Valley of the Giants (1938) – Bill Cardigan
 Brother Rat (1938) – Billy Randolph
 The Kid from Kokomo (1939) – Homer Baston
 The Return of Doctor X (1939) – Walter Garrett
 Brother Rat and a Baby (1940) – Billy Randolph
 Double Alibi (1940) – Stephen Wayne
 An Angel from Texas (1940) – Mac McClure
 Flight Angels (1940) – Artie Dixon
 Gambling on the High Seas (1940) – Jim Carter
 Ladies Must Live (1940) – Corey Lake
 The Quarterback (1940) – Jimmy Jones and Billy Jones
 I Wanted Wings (1941) – Tom Cassidy
 Badmen of Missouri (1941) – Bob Younger
 Three Sons o' Guns (1941) – Charley Patterson
 The Smiling Ghost (1941) – Lucky Downing
 Deep Valley (1947) – Jeff Barker
 The Voice of the Turtle (1947) – Comm. Ned Burling
 The Time of Your Life (1948) – Tom (Joe's stooge and friend)
 The Big Punch (1948) – Chris Thorgenson
 John Loves Mary (1949) – Lt. Victor O'Leary
 A Kiss in the Dark (1949) – Bruce Arnold
 The Younger Brothers (1949) – Cole Younger
 Task Force (1949) – McKinney
 The House Across the Street (1949) – Dave Joslin
 Johnny One-Eye (1950) – Dane Cory
 The Tougher They Come (1950) – Bill Shaw
 Stage to Tucson (1951) – Barney Broderick
 Sierra Passage (1950) – Johnny Yorke
 The Big Gusher (1951) – Kenny Blake
 The Bushwhackers (1951) – Marshal John Harding
 Yellow Fin (1951) – Mike Donovan
 Desert Pursuit (1952) – Ford Smith
 Arctic Flight (1952) – Mike Wien
 Star of Texas (1953) – Texas Ranger Ed Ryan / Robert Larkin
 The Marksman (1953) – Deputy Marshal Mike Martin
 The Fighting Lawman (1953)  – Deputy Marshal Jim Burke
 Texas Bad Man (1953) – Walt
 Riding Shotgun (1954) – Deputy Sheriff Tub Murphy
 The Desperado (1954) – Sam Garrett
  The Master Plan (1954) – Maj. Thomas Brent
 Two Guns and a Badge (1954) – Deputy Jim Blake
  The Green Carnation (1954) – Gary Holden
 Port of Hell (1954) – Stanley Povich
 Lord of the Jungle (1955) – Jeff Wood
 Lonesome Trail (1955) – Dandy Dayton
 Cross Channel (1955) – Tex Parker
 The Gelignite Gang (1956) – Jimmy Baxter
 The Crooked Sky (1957) – Mike Conlin
 Paths of Glory (1957) – Lieutenant Roget
 Plunder Road (1957) – Commando Munson
 Official Detective (1958, Episode: "The Cover-Up") – Holmes
 Buffalo Gun (1961) – Roche (final film role)

References

Further reading
Hoyt, Edwin P. McCampbell's Heroes: the Story of the U.S. Navy's Most Celebrated Carrier Fighter of the Pacific.  
Wise, James. Stars in Blue: Movie Actors in America's Sea Services. Annapolis, MD: Naval Institute Press, 1997.

External links
 
 

1914 births
1959 deaths
20th-century American male actors
American World War II flying aces
American male film actors
American male stage actors
American male television actors
Aviators from California
Burials at Arlington National Cemetery
Recipients of the Air Medal
Recipients of the Distinguished Flying Cross (United States)
United States Naval Aviators
United States Navy officers
United States Navy pilots of World War II
Warner Bros. contract players
Deaths from coronary artery disease